Alejandro Camilo Garcia (born March 30, 1994) is an American soccer player who plays as a midfielder.

Career

College & Amateur
After two years of college soccer at Darton State College, García transferred to the University of Cincinnati, where he tallied twelve goals in 37 appearances for the Bearcats.

García also appeared for Premier Development League side Cincinnati Dutch Lions in 2015.

Professional
García signed with United Soccer League side Orlando City B on March 11, 2016.

References

External links

1994 births
Living people
Association football midfielders
American soccer players
Cincinnati Bearcats men's soccer players
Cincinnati Dutch Lions players
Orlando City B players
Soccer players from Florida
USL League Two players
USL Championship players
Sportspeople from Bakersfield, California
Soccer players from California
Darton State Cavaliers men's soccer players
National Independent Soccer Association players